Guru Sishyulu is a 1990 Telugu-language action comedy film produced by M. Purna Prakash and S. Sambasiva Rao under the Srilatha Art Productions banner and directed by S. P. Muthuraman. It stars Krishnam Raju, Rajendra Prasad, Sumalatha and Khushbu, with music composed by Ilaiyaraaja.

Plot
The film begins at Central Jail where two petty thieves Raja and Babu are guilty. Therein, they are acquainted with an innocent guy, Manohar, who is destined for the death sentence. He wants to meet Raja and Babu as his last wish and narrates his story. Once, his sister Sumathi was kidnapped by a Taxi driver and molested and killed by a malicious Muddu Krishna, the younger brother of a millionaire Raja Shekaram. Manohar filed up the case when Inspector Paramasivam abettor of blackguards manipulated. Thereupon, Jairam partner of Raja Shekaram intrigued and indicted him in the crime of killing the taxi driver. Right now, Raja and Babu decide to rescue Manohar and holds over the judgment by breaking his hand. Soon after, they start up their trials, initially, they confine Paramasivam with his help Raja joins as a bodyguard for Muddu Krishna. Parallelly, Babu traps Chitra daughter of Raja Shekaram into his love. In the meantime, Raja falls for Geeta daughter of Paramasivam. Just after, they detect that Manohar's parents are under the custody of Raja Shekaram and Jairam as Manohar's father Narayana Rao is aware of a hidden treasure. So, they protect them when Raja recognizes them as his parents too. Here as a flabbergast, Babu identifies Narayana Rao as a homicide of his parents when a clash arises between Raja and Babu which calms down after learning the truth. Indeed, the real culprit is Raja Shekaram who killed Babu's parents in the veil of Narayana Rao. At last, Raja and Babu ceases the baddies, safeguards the treasure, and prove Manohar guiltless. Finally, the movie ends on a happy note with the marriages of Raja and Geetha and Babu and Chitra.

Cast
 Krishnam Raju as Raja
 Rajendra Prasad as Babu
 Sumalatha as Geeta
 Khushbu as Chitra
 Gollapudi Maruti Rao as Jairam
 Kota Srinivasa Rao as Inspector Paramashivam
 Sudhakar as Muddu Krishna
 Rama Krishna as Raja Shekaram
 Manorama as Manjula
 Hema Sundar as Narayana Rao
 Maharshi Raghava as Manohar
 Mada Venkateswara Rao
 Telephone Satyanarayana as D.I.G. Prabhu

Soundtrack

Music was composed by Ilaiyaraaja. Lyrics were written by Acharya Aatreya. Music released on Echo Audio Company.

References

1990s Telugu-language films
1990 action comedy films
Indian action comedy films
1990s masala films
Telugu remakes of Hindi films
Films directed by S. P. Muthuraman
Films scored by Ilaiyaraaja
1990 films